Shary or Shariy (or Шарый) may refer to:

 Anatoly Shariy (born 1978), Ukrainian videoblogger
 Andrey Shary (born 1965), Russian journalist and author
 Ivan Shariy (born 1957), Ukrainian footballer
 John H. Shary (1872–1945), American farmer and entrepreneur
 Timothy Shary (born 1967), American film scholar
 Valery Shary (born 1947), Belarusian weightlifter

See also
 
 
 Szary (disambiguation)

East Slavic-language surnames